Ratajczak is a Polish-language surname. It is a patronymic surname of Northern Poland origin  formed by the addition of the diminutive suffix "-czak"   to father's nickname or surname  "Rataj", "farmer" (historical term). It may refer to:

 Alicja Ratajczak (born 1995), Polish cyclist
 Dariusz Ratajczak (1962–2010), Polish historian
 Donald Ratajczak (born 1942), economist
 Elżbieta Ratajczak (born 1946), Polish politician
 Jacek Ratajczak (born 1973), Polish footballer
 Michael Ratajczak (born 1982) German footballer

See also
 Ratajczyk

References

Polish-language surnames